Mayak is a rural locality (a selo) and the administrative center of Mayaksky Selsoviet, Charyshsky District, Altai Krai, Russia. The population was 455 as of 2013. It was founded in 1890. There are 8 streets.

Geography 
Mayak is located 49 km north of Charyshskoye (the district's administrative centre) by road. Pervomaysky is the nearest rural locality.

References 

Rural localities in Tselinny District, Altai Krai